Bernadette Gray-Little is a retired academic administrator most recently serving as the 17th chancellor of the University of Kansas, where she was the first African-American and female to serve as the chancellor. She oversaw the university's main campus in Lawrence, its medical center campuses in Kansas City, Salina and Wichita, the Edwards Campus in Overland Park, and other facilities around Kansas. She replaced chancellor Robert Hemenway in August 2009, and retired in June 2017.

Background
Bernadette Gray-Little was born Bernadette Gray in Washington, North Carolina in 1945. She received her B.A. from Marywood University in (Scranton, PA) and an M.S. and PhD in psychology from Saint Louis University. As part of a Fulbright Foundation fellowship, she conducted postdoctoral research in cross-cultural psychology in Denmark. She has also been a Social Science Research Council Fellow and a recipient of a Ford Foundation Senior Scholar Fellowship through the National Research Council.

Employment history
University of North Carolina at Chapel Hill

1971–1976, Assistant Director and Supervisor, Family Practice Center
1971–1982, Professor, Assistant to Full, Psychology
1983–1993, Director, Graduate Program in Clinical Psychology
1993–1998, Chair, Department of Psychology
1999–2001, Senior Associate Dean – Undergraduate Education
2001–2004, Executive Associate Provost
2004–2006, Dean, College of Arts and Sciences
2006–2009, Executive Vice Chancellor and Provost

University of Kansas
2009–2017, Chancellor

Boards and committees
Gray-Little was one of four university leaders selected to represent the Association of Public and Land-grant Universities at a White House summit on math and science education in January 2010. She has held a number of leadership positions and memberships on a variety of boards and committees, including several with the American Psychological Association. She also served as a faculty affiliate at the Center for Creative leadership from 1998–2004. She currently serves on the board of trustees of the Online Computer Library Center and the board of US Bank.

On September 22, 2016, Gray-Little announced she would retire at the end of the 2016–17 school year.

References

External links

1945 births
Living people
Chancellors of the University of Kansas
People from Washington, North Carolina
Educators from Kansas
American women educators
21st-century American women
Women heads of universities and colleges